Northbridge High School is a public high school in Northbridge, Massachusetts. The school is operated by the Northbridge Public Schools.

History
Northbridge High School was established in 1866. Originally, the school was located on Church Street. In 1890, Northbridge High moved to the corner of Cottage and Hill Streets. In 1906, a larger school building was constructed. Currently, the school is located on Linwood Avenue.

Athletics
Home of the Rams, Northbridge High athletic teams sport the colors of maroon and white. The school uses the New England Sports Center in Marlborough as a venue.

Notable alumni
Alice Burke, politician
Lincoln P. Cole, politician
Steven Dorian (1996), singer
John Kizirian, United States Armed Forces officer
Phil Vandersea (1961), professional football player

See also
List of high schools in Massachusetts

References

External links
Official website

Educational institutions established in 1866
Schools in Worcester County, Massachusetts
Public high schools in Massachusetts
Northbridge, Massachusetts